Mountain View Academy (Africa) is a South African private school situated in Cape Town's northern suburb, Monte Vista. Established in 2006, it features a primary school (Grade1 to 7) and a high school (Grade 8 to 12), as well as a special needs school called Perpetua House.

The school focuses on children with ADHD, ADD, anxiety and other problems. Classrooms at Mountain View Academy at kept at an maximum of 10 learners per classroom per grade. The South Africa Department of Basic Education reported in December 2016 that enrollment at the school was 108 students, with 16 teachers, and a 7:1 student teacher ratio.

In 2018, Mountain View Academy established a "sister school" relationship with The Philile Project's Program in Gugulethu.

References

External links
 

2006 establishments in South Africa
Educational institutions established in 2006
High schools in South Africa
Primary schools in South Africa
Private schools in the Western Cape
Schools in Cape Town